Iric Branch is a stream in the U.S. state of Georgia. It is a tributary to Black Creek.

A variant name is "Iric Creek". The stream derives its name from Adam Eirick, an 18th-century landholder.

References

Rivers of Georgia (U.S. state)
Rivers of Bulloch County, Georgia